Cephea is a genus of true jellyfish in the family Cepheidae. They are found in the Indo-Pacific and eastern Atlantic oceans. They are sometimes called the crown jellyfish, but this can cause confusion with the closely related genus Netrostoma or the distantly related species in the order Coronatae. They are also sometimes called the cauliflower jellyfish because of the cauliflower-looking form on top of its bell.

Description

Habitat 
Found in tropical, pelagic oceanic regions from the Eastern Central Atlantic to Indo-Western Pacific

Lifestyle 
Lives in a marine environment

Relationships

Impacts

Species

According to the World Register of Marine Species, this genus includes the following species:

 Cephea cephea
 Cephea coerulea

Invalid names 
 Cephea octostyla

References

Cepheidae
Scyphozoan genera